Arontorp is a locality situated in Mörbylånga Municipality, Kalmar County, Sweden with 233 inhabitants in 2010.

References 

Populated places in Kalmar County
Populated places in Mörbylånga Municipality